Pete T. Rich is an American television soap opera script writer. During the WGA strike, he chose financial core status with the WGA and continued working.

Positions held
All My Children
 Script Writer: 1994 - 1996

Days of Our Lives
 Script Writer: 1993, October 4, 2011 – July 27, 2012

Guiding Light
 Script Writer: 1984 - 1993, 1997–1999

Passions
 Script Writer: 1999 - 2008

Santa Barbara
 Script Writer: 1993

Awards and nominations
Daytime Emmy Awards

WINS
(1986, 1990 & 1993; Best Writing; Guiding Light)
(1996; Best Writing; All My Children)
(2004; Best Original Song; Passions)
(2012; Best Writing; Days of Our Lives)

NOMINATIONS 
(1985, 1989, 1992 & 1999; Best Writing; Guiding Light)
(1995; Best Writing; All My Children)
(2001, 2002 & 2003; Best Writing; Passions)

Writers Guild of America Award

WINS
(1992 season; Guiding Light)
(2014 season; Days of Our Lives)

NOMINATIONS 
(1985, 1986, 1989, 1998 & 1999 seasons; Guiding Light)
(1994 season; Days of Our Lives)
(1996 season; All My Children)
(2001 season; Passions)

External links

American soap opera writers
American male television writers
Year of birth missing (living people)
Living people
Daytime Emmy Award winners
Writers Guild of America Award winners